Andre "Dre" Fortune II (born 3 July 1996) is a professional footballer who plays as a midfielder for Nõmme Kalju. Born in the United States, he plays for the Trinidad and Tobago national team.

Career
In 2011, Fortune spent time training with top clubs in Europe, including Barcelona, Manchester City and Tottenham. Fortune also trialled in his native United States with New York Red Bulls in June 2015, but elected not to sign with the club. He signed his first professional contract in the US with United Soccer League side Rochester Rhinos.

In 2017, Fortune signed with North Carolina FC, becoming the first product of the team's development academy to sign a professional contract with the team.

Fortune served as an assistant coach for the North Carolina FC U23 squad during the 2018 PDL season.

He was named USL Championship Player of the Week for Week 14 of the 2019 season after scoring two goals in a 3–1 win over the Tampa Bay Rowdies. He earned the honor again in Week 24 after scoring two goals and an assist in a 5–0 win over Pittsburgh Riverhounds SC.

In 2020, Fortune led North Carolina FC in scoring and was named the team's Offensive Player of the Year and Most Valuable Player for the season.

On 11 May 2021, Fortune moved to USL Championship side Memphis 901.

International career
Fortune was born in the United States, but opted to represent Trinidad & Tobago at the Under-17s and Under-20s level, for whom he qualifies via his parents.

In September 2019, he was called to the national team for its CONCACAF Nations League matches against Martinique. He remained on the bench for both games, which both ended in draws.

He made his debut on 14 October 2019 in a friendly against Venezuela  and earned his first start in a friendly against Ecuador on 15 November 2019.

Personal 
Fortune's brother, Ajani, plays for Atlanta United 2 of the USL Championship.

References

External links

1996 births
Living people
Citizens of Trinidad and Tobago through descent
Trinidad and Tobago footballers
Trinidad and Tobago youth international footballers
Trinidad and Tobago under-20 international footballers
Trinidad and Tobago international footballers
2021 CONCACAF Gold Cup players
Rochester New York FC players
North Carolina FC players
Memphis 901 FC players
Association football midfielders
USL Championship players
Soccer players from North Carolina
Soccer players from Raleigh, North Carolina
American soccer players
USL League Two coaches
American sportspeople of Trinidad and Tobago descent